Wilhelmsson may refer to:

Hans Wilhelmsson Ahlmann (1889–1974), Swedish geographer, glaciologist, and diplomat
Christian Wilhelmsson (born 1979), AKA Chippen, Swedish former professional footballer
Gunnar Wilhelmsson (born 1954), Swedish former footballer
Hans Wilhelmsson (1936–2004), Swedish speed skater
Jonathan Wilhelmsson (born 1991), Swedish director and filmmaker
Lars-Åke Wilhelmsson (born 1958), Swedish fashion designer and drag artist

See also
 Wilhelms
 Wilhelmsen
 Wilhelmson

Swedish-language surnames